Pendleton Township is one of sixteen townships in Jefferson County, Illinois, USA.  As of the 2010 census, its population was 1,206 and it contained 461 housing units.

Geography
The township is centered at 38°16'N 88°45'W (38.259,-89.755). It is traversed east–west by Interstate Route 64 and northwest to southeast by State Route 142.

Cities, towns, villages
 Belle Rive

Unincorporated towns
 Opdyke at 
(This list is based on USGS data and may include former settlements.)

Extinct towns
 Harris Grove at 
 Lynchburg at 
(These towns are listed as "historical" by the USGS.)

Adjacent townships
 Webber Township (north)
 Four Mile Township, Wayne County (northeast)
 Dahlgren Township, Hamilton County (southeast)
 Moore's Prairie Township (south)
 Spring Garden Township (southwest)
 Dodds Township (west)
 Mt. Vernon Township (northwest)

Cemeteries
The township contains these nine cemeteries: Flint, Laird, New Hope, Opdyke, Rentchler, Richardson Farm, Shelton, Smith and Wall Farm.

Major highways
  Interstate 64
  Illinois Route 142

Demographics

School districts
 Hamilton County Community Unit School District 10

Political districts
 Illinois's 19th congressional district
 State House District 107
 State Senate District 54

References
 
 United States Census Bureau 2007 TIGER/Line Shapefiles
 United States National Atlas

External links
 City-Data.com
 Illinois State Archives

Townships in Jefferson County, Illinois
Mount Vernon, Illinois micropolitan area
Townships in Illinois